Cyclanoline is an acetylcholinesterase inhibitor isolated from Stephania venosa tuber.

References

Acetylcholinesterase inhibitors